Tumbarumba is a wine region in New South Wales, Australia. It is part of the Southern New South Wales zone and was entered in the Register of Protected Names on 10 December 1998. It surrounds the town of Tumbarumba and is on the western foothills of the Snowy Mountains.

Tumbarumba has plantings of about  roughly evenly split between white and red varieties. The dominant white variety is chardonnay and the dominant red variety is pinot noir. Between them, they are about 80% of total plantings.

The first vineyards were planted in 1982. It is now known for producing sparkling wines as well as cool-climate table wines, as it is the coolest climate grape-growing region in New South Wales.

Much of the grape crop from the region is sold to major wine companies with production facilities outside of the area. There are also a few local wine producers.

References

Wine regions of New South Wales